Christophe Porquier is a French politician, a member of The Greens-Europe Écologie. He is a former municipal councillor in Amiens.

In 2009, he was selected to be The Greens-Europe Écologie's candidate in Picardy for the 2010 regional elections.

References

Year of birth missing (living people)
Living people
French politicians
Place of birth missing (living people)